Carolina Gillespie (born 29 May 1993) is an Italian pair skater. She competed with Luca Demattè from 2010 to 2012. They announced the end of their partnership in April 2012.

Programs

With Demattè

With Aggiano

Competitive highlights

With Demattè

With Aggiano

References

External links 

 
 

Italian female pair skaters
1993 births
Living people
Figure skaters from Milan
20th-century Italian women
21st-century Italian women